North Bay is a hamlet located in Oneida County, New York, United States. The zipcode is: 13123.

Notes

Hamlets in Oneida County, New York
Hamlets in New York (state)